No Time To Die is a 2006 Ghanaian comic and romantic  movie produced by , a German, writer and director  and co-produced by King Ampaw, an award-winning Ghanaian director and actor. The movie was directed by King Ampaw. The music was composed by Ben Michael Mankhamba a Malawian guitarist, singer, songwriter, composer. The costumes were designed by Lisa Meier. It was produced in 2006 in Ghana and Germany. It is an English speaking movie which lasts for 95 minutes. It  was selected in December 2016 at the African Diaspora International Film Festival (ADIFF) in New York.

Premise 
Asante, a funeral car driver in Ghana, needs a spouse but his work puts most ladies off. He begins to look all starry eyed at a customer (Esi) whose mother has passed on, and figured out how to prevail upon her. Be that as it may, her dad precludes union with a funeral care driver. Asante continues and turns into the principal funeral car driver in Accra to get married. This movie was to explain the African culture showing the change in African funeral traditions due to the social impact of colonialism in Africa.

Cast 

 Fritz Baffour as Ofori
 Kofi Bucknor as Owusu
 Agnes Dapaa as Aba
David Dontoh as Asante
 Emmanuel France as Safo
 Evans Oma Hunter as Kokuroko
 Issifu Kassim as Issifu
 Agatha Ofori as Esi
 Kofi Middleton Mends

Production

Crew

 King Ampaw (Director & Co-producer)
  (Producer)
 Claudia Sontheim (Co-producer & Line producer)
  (Executive Producer)
 Ben Mankhamba (Music)
 Claudia Di Mauro (Editor) 
 Lisa Meier (Costumes)
 Michael Schlömer (sound)

References 

Ghanaian comedy films
2006 films
2000s English-language films
English-language Ghanaian films
English-language German films